The 1907–08 Sheffield Shield season was the 16th season of the Sheffield Shield, the domestic first-class cricket competition of Australia. Victoria won the championship but only four matches took place because South Australia did not play their home matches.

Table

Statistics

Most Runs
Monty Noble 585

Most Wickets
Jack Saunders 20

References

Sheffield Shield
Sheffield Shield
Sheffield Shield seasons